Šalka Vas is a settlement immediately northeast of the town of Kočevje in southern Slovenia. The area is part of the traditional region of Lower Carniola and is now included in the Southeast Slovenia Statistical Region.

Name
Šalka Vas was attested in historical records as Schalkhendorf in 1574. The name is believed to be derived from the Slavic personal name *Šalъ, referring to an early inhabitant of the place.

History
The Šalka Vas volunteer fire department became a founding unit of the Kočevje municipal fire department on 28 August 1955.

Church

The local church is dedicated to Saint Roch and belongs to the Parish of Kočevje. It is a Late Gothic building that was extended in the 19th century.

References

External links
Šalka Vas on Geopedia
Pre–World War II map of Šalka Vas with oeconyms and family names

Populated places in the Municipality of Kočevje